Maeve Patricia Mary Theresa Gilmore (14 June 19173 August 1983) was a British painter, sculptor and writer, and the wife of author Mervyn Peake.

Early life 

Gilmore was born in 1917 and brought up in Brixton, south London, where her father, Owen Eugene Gilmore (1862–1950), was a doctor. She was educated at a convent boarding school in Sussex, now St Leonards-Mayfield School, and later attended a finishing school in Switzerland, where she learnt to speak German and French, and became a good pianist (she particularly enjoyed the music of Johann Sebastian Bach).

She attended Westminster School of Art, where in 1936 she met Mervyn Peake, whose father was also a doctor.

Marriage and children 
They married in 1937. They had three children, Sebastian, Fabian (who married the artist Phyllida Barlow), and Clare.

An accomplished painter and sculptor, she also wrote several short stories. However, when Peake became ill, she put her career on hold to care for him. Her memoir A World Away (1970) was written in the years immediately following Peake's death, and depicts their life together.

Career as an artist
Following art college, Gilmore exhibited her work at galleries in London. Her style was influenced by the modernist and avant-garde movements. However, the Second World War, marriage and Peake's illness curtailed her public artistic career. She continued to paint, including covering the walls and furniture of the family home in Drayton Gardens in Chelsea with murals. Her earlier works were portraits and still life, with her children as later subjects as her style became more abstract. These were documented in detailed photographs before the family sold the house after her death. 

She exhibited at the Langton Gallery in London in 1979. In 1981 she published a children's book, Captain Eustace and the Magic Room, that she had written and illustrated with dolls, working with artist Kenneth Welfare.

Titus Awakes 
In the late 1950s, Peake's health began to decline and he finished Titus Alone, the third novel in his series of Titus books, following Titus Groan  (1946), and Gormenghast (1950), only with difficulty. When published in 1959, Titus Alone was less polished than he might have wished, but he was beyond correcting it. He had always planned a longer series, taking his hero up to his forties at least. On his death from dementia with Lewy bodies in November 1968, Peake left a few pages of notes for a fourth book, of which fewer than a thousand words are legible.

During the 1970s, Gilmore worked on the fourth Titus book herself, inspired partly by the list of people and places that Peake had imagined might feature in it. By 1980, she had completed a narrative she called Search Without End. It told the story of Titus backwards – not returning to Gormenghast, but to Sark where his creator Peake had lived in the early 1930s and again between 1946 and 1949, taking in along the way some of Peake's experiences (as a Parkinsonian patient in hospital, for example). In her final version, however, she avoided mentioning any name or event from the Titus books, with the exception of the name of the hero, so that her book could be read independently of her husband's work. She showed it to a few people, who did not encourage her to seek publication.

Early in 2010, Gilmore's children and grandchildren decided to publish it in time for the centenary of Mervyn Peake's birth in July 2011. Of the various versions, they preferred one that made direct reference to the Titus books, and arranged for the publisher, Vintage (in the UK; Overlook in the USA), to reprint Peake's notes as the first chapter. They called it by one of Peake's titles for his own novel, "Titus Awakes", subtitling it The Lost Book of Gormenghast.

Reviewing Titus Awakes, Michael Moorcock declared it "a fascinating, intensely personal homage", saying that Gilmore "successfully echoes the music of the originals, if not the eloquent precision of Peake's baroque style as she sends Titus on his adventure."

Posthumous re-discovery 
Some of her work was exhibited at the Ancient & Modern gallery, London in 2014. 

In 2022 a retrospective exhibition of her art was held at Studio Voltaire in Clapham, south London, which called it her first institutional exhibition, and situated her alongside contemporaries such as Vanessa Bell and Winifred Knights, and Surrealists Leonora Carrington, Eileen Agar and Ithell Colquhoun. Its subject was family life, especially their children. It was reviewed in Apollo and by Rachel Campbell-Johnston in The Times. The Guardian called her "a shrewd and loving observer of domestic life" who "belongs in the company of women who deserve respect for their artistry, not pity for their disadvantages." Her story was featured on BBC Radio 4 Woman's Hour

References

Further reading

External links 
 Goodreads
 Portrait of Maeve Gilmore by Mervyn Peake
 Instagram account

1917 births
1983 deaths
20th-century British painters
British writers
People educated at St Leonards-Mayfield School
20th-century British sculptors
People from London